FreqTweak is an open-source tool for real-time audio spectral manipulation and display. It is free software, available under the GNU General Public License. FreqTweak can (and is supposed to) be connected to other audio software using the JACK Audio Connection Kit.

Description 

FreqTweak is FFT-based, and supports up to four channels. An FFT analysis is applied to each audio channel, and every individual frequency band can have a different effect applied to it. In version 0.6.1 the following effects are available:

 EQ cut/boost
 Pitch scaling
 Gate
 Compressor
 Delay
 Limit
 Warp

References

Free audio software
Free software programmed in C++
Audio software with JACK support
Software that uses wxWidgets